Ksour, Bordj Bou Arreridj is a town and commune in Bordj Bou Arréridj Province, Algeria. According to the 1998 census it had a population of 12,540.

References

Communes of Bordj Bou Arréridj Province
Bordj Bou Arréridj Province